A keytar is a keyboard or synthesizer hung around the neck and shoulders, similar to a guitar.

List of keytars

 [no grip]         — keyboard model without control grip.
 [opt grip]   — keyboard model with optional control grip.

Custom/rare keytars

Rare keytar products

 Delmar Brown "Illuminator" (illuminating display attached to keytar)
 Guess Musical Instruments "Schizotron", a product which combined keyboard and guitar/bass
 "Nissin C-16", a custom keytar version of Casio SK-1, distributed as lottery goods for promoting Nissin Cup Noodles
 Suzuki "Omnichord" and "QChord", electronic chord instruments inspired by Oscar Schmidt Autoharp
 "Zen Riffer", used most notably by Jordan Rudess of Dream Theater.

Drum/Percussion keytars
 Dynacord Rhythm Stick (also known as "Jamma" since 1982) 
 Tsumura JD21 
 Drumitar / Zendrum (2008)
 "Riday T91"

Custom made keytars
In alphabetical order:
 "Alien Guitar Simulator", a selfmade keytar by Le Orme keyboard player Michele Bon.
 "Arcadetar", a keytar-like keyboard controller combined a pitch sensor in 20 inch. (50 cm) long, developed by Italian musician Andrea Lomuscio of Teapot Industries in 2012.
 Jeri Ellsworth's FPGA-based C64 keytar
 Lady Gaga's custom made keytar during The Monster Ball Tour in 2010.
 "Lag Circulaire" made for Jean Michel Jarre
 "Lag Insecte" made for Jean Michel Jarre
 "Lag Mad Max" made for Jean Michel Jarre 
 Matthew Bellamy's "Keytarcaster" Manson, made for playing Undisclosed Desires from Muse's 5th studio album, The Resistance
 Prince's "PurpleAxxe", also played by Tommy Barbarella
 "Politrep", a copy of the Zen Riffer keytar made by order at the website space4keys.com
 "Remote" for Jean Michel Jarre's studio by Lag
 "Syblade", a keytar designed to be unique and to inspire.

Customized keytars

Based on minimoog keyboards
 Custom minimoog keyboard used by Gary Wright and Steve Porcaro around 1976.
 Cruder, Jan Hammer's early custom keyboard with block shaped controller.
 Plexi minimoog keyboard used by George Duke

Based on Yamaha KX series
 Jean Michel Jarre's custom KX5, two versions: Houston and Docklands Concerts.
 Lights Poxleitner plays a rare Yamaha KX5 keytar.

Based on Roland AX series
 Vadim Pruzhanov of DragonForce and Henrik Klingenberg of Sonata Arctica both use a custom Roland AX-7 (although nowadays Henrik Klingenberg uses custom Roland AX-1)
 Christopher Bowes of Alestorm owns a Roland AX-7 which he has customised over the years with various stickers of animals.
 Jeff Abbott, long-time keytar player and product demonstrator for MusicLab plays a custom wooden keytar based around a Roland AX-1.

Gallery

See also 

 Keytar
 List of keytarists

References 

Keytars